Bunlue Thongkliang (born May 6, 1995) is a Thai professional footballer who plays as a left winger.

External links
 

1995 births
Living people
Bunlue Thongkliang
Association football midfielders
Bunlue Thongkliang
Bunlue Thongkliang
Bunlue Thongkliang